Sultan al-Hasan ibn Sulaiman, often referred to as "Abu'l-Muwahib" ("father of gifts"), was a ruler of Kilwa Kisiwani, in present-day Tanzania, from 1310 until 1333. His full name was Abu al-Muzaffar Hasan Abu al-Muwahib ibn Sulaiman al-Mat'un ibn Hasan ibn Talut al-Mahdal.

History 
Al-Hasan ibn Sulaiman was a member of the Mahdali dynasty, and oversaw a period of great prosperity in his capital city of Kilwa. The Mahdal claim descent from the Prophet of Islam. He built the extensive Palace of Husuni Kubwa outside of the city and added a significant extension to the Great Mosque of Kilwa. This building activity seems to have been inspired by the Sultan's pilgrimage to Mecca, whose great buildings he wished to emulate. In 1331 the traveller Ibn Battuta visited the court of the sultan and described the Sultan's great generosity, whence stemmed the appellation "father of gifts."

See also
Kilwa Sultanate
Shirazi (ethnic group)
Ali ibn al-Hassan Shirazi

References 

Precolonial Tanzania
Sultans
Shirazi people
14th-century Arabs